Sakaldwipiya Brahmins (also known as Bhojaka Brahmins or Maga Brahmins) are a class of Brahmin priests primarily concentrated in the Eastern Indian states of West Bengal, Orissa, Bihar and Uttar Pradesh.

History
According to the Samba Purana (c.500 - c.800 CE), Samba, the son of Krishna, the king of Sambapura, constructed a sun temple in Mitravan on the bank of Chandrabhaga river. But no local Brahmin agreed to worship in the temple, so Samba brought eighteen families of Maga, descendents of Jarasabda (Zarathustra) from Shakdvipa i.e Saka country (Central Asia). The Chinese traveler Xuanzang mentioned the Multan Sun Temple of Multan in the 7th century, which is identified as Sambapura by modern scholars. Gradually, they spread to other parts of India. They had knowledge of Astronomy, Astrology and medicines. The inscription of Narasimhagupta in Shahabad district of Bihar records land grants to the sun god in favour of Bhojaka Suryamitra.  Prominent ancient Astronomers such as Varāhamihira and Arya Bhatta were Maga. They helped in the establishment of temples in different regions of the Indian subcontinent, such as  Martand Sun Temple, Khajuraho Sun Temple, Konark Sun Temple, Somnath temple etc. They also served as priests in these temples, priests for kings in different kingdoms.

Historical sources

Hindu texts 
The earliest extant Hindu text to mention the Magas is Samba Purana (c. 7th-8th century CE). This legend made its way into the Bhavishya Purana and even a twelfth century inscription in Eastern India.

After being cursed into a leper, Samba had urged Krishna to restore his youth. Krishna expressed his inability and asserted that only the Sun-God had such abilities. So, acting upon the advice of Narada, Samba left for the forests of Mitravan on the banks of Chandrabhaga, which already served as His sacred lands. There, he propitiated Sun into appearing before himself and secured boons of cure and eternal fame. In return, Samba had to set up solar temples; Bhavishya Purana mentions that He had specifically instructed to be installed at the banks of Chandrabhaga, as His perpetual abode. The next day, Samba received an icon of the Sun-God while bathing.

However, securing a priest for the temple turned out to be difficult. Both Narada and Gauramukha emphatically rejected the prospects of any Brahmin attending to a temple-icon since such worshippers took the offerings for themselves and had to ran afoul of Manusmriti. Magas were mentioned to be the only classes fit for the task but that neither knew about their location except to be far away from Dwarka, the Sun-God himself was suggested for further guidance. Gauramukha also provided a detailed description about the antecedents of the Magas:.

The Sun-God confirmed that none in Jamudwipa was fit for His worship; only among the inhabitants of Sakdwipa—an entire creation of His own—were to be found the Magas, fluent in Vedas and his potential worshippers. In Sakdwipa, Brahmins were the Magas; Kṣatriyas, Maśakas; Vaiśyas, Mānasas; and Śūdras, Mandagas. Eighteen Maga families would travel across an ocean on the back of Garuda. Subsequently, the first Sun-temple was established in Sambapura.

No further details about the Magas are provided in the Samba Purana but Bhavishya Purana continues to chronicle the life of Magas in India, often in self-contradictory ways. Samba apparently arranged for the women of Bhojas (id. uncertain; might be the eponymous Kings of early medieval India) to be married to them; this went against the earlier narrative of bringing eighteen Maga "families." These Bhoja in-laws of Magas were referred to as Bhojakas notwithstanding Gauramukha's usage of the term. In a later chapter, it is even claimed that eight of the migrant Magas were actually born of Mandagas and hence had to marry Dasas; their progenies did not receive Brahminical knowledge unlike those from the union with Bhojas.

Analysis 
On the basis of terminological similarities in relevant Puranic verses with proto-Iranian roots and a common tradition of Sun worship, most scholars deem the legend to reflect the migration of Magis of Persia (or some region under the influence of Persian cosmopolis) in multiple waves to India over an extended period of time. Sambapura has been identified with Multan (and the temple with the eponymous institution) but there exists little evidence in support and Heinrich von Stietencron rejects the idea. The later arrivals were deemed as Bhojakas, a term conspicuously absent in Samba Purana.

Buddhist texts 
Mahāvibhāṣa Śāstra, a Buddhist text from Kashmir c. 2nd century C.E. notes the Magas to be Mlechhas (lit. barbarians) for not seeing anything objectionable in having sexual relations with own family. Karma Prajnapti, dated to around the same time, repeats the observations of incest; Magas apparently held women as property of the commons — like cooked rice and pestle, roads and river banks, and fruits and flowers — whose sexuality was accessible to all. In Tarkajvālā (6th century CE), Bhāviveka notes the Magas to be perverted people from Persia: their religious doctrines exhibited similarities with Vedas, in that agamyā-gamana was supported. Never were they held to be Brahmins.

Analysis 

Bronkhorst sees no reason to doubt that the Buddhist texts were referring to the Magas. However, that the Magas are always held to be in the West, Jonathan Silk doubts that the Magas might not have followed such practices and they were merely (but reasonably) confused with the Persians.

Others 
Varāhamihira’s (6th century CE) Bṛhat Saṃhitā mention the Magas; he himself might have been a Maga. In his Pañcasiddhāntikā, one "Year of Magas" mention 30 names of the "lords of degree of signs" — they are since understood to be a Saivite rendering of the list of Yazatas. Ptolemy’s Geography (2nd century CE) noted a particular town to be inhabited by Maga Brahmins. Al-Biruni, an 11th century Persian polymath, noted some Zoroastrians to have migrated to India where they were known as Magas and in a hostile relation with Buddhists.

Social status 
In the Brahminical corpus all Mlechhas (foreigners) are routinely referred to in the "most disagreeable terms" and either held to be below Sudras or bereft of varna. Saura literature is very scarce in the Hindu cannon and in all probabilities, Magas failed to ever exert considerable influence on any royal power. Consequently, why were the Magas allowed the Brahmin status in society remains a pertinent locus of enquiry. 

R. C. Hazra—a preeminent scholar of Puranic literature—believes the Magas and their particular brand of Sun-worship to have gained immense popularity under Scythian patronage; hence, the Brahmins were compelled to draft the Samba Purana, infuse aspects of their cult into prevalent , and accommodate them in the elites. Stietencron, on a comparative assessment of Samba Purana with other texts, disagrees: little foreign influence was visible in the descriptions of the Puranic episode and if at all, the Magas had popularized a pre-existing cult of solar worship. Bronkhorst remarks that even if the Magas had claimed descent from Persian priestly traditions, the Brahminic classes of India (Jambudvīpa) won't have easily accommodated foreigners at the highest echelons of society. On a comparison with Buddhist texts and secular records, he proposes that Sakadvipa was not Persia (or some other territory, west of India) but a "mythico-geographical region" for classical Hindu authors, wherein prevailed the Brahmanical order of society for reasons unknown. Descendants of the Magi migrants of Persia staked a claim to this Brahminic space rather than their native place. By the Common Era, their claims would be accepted and serviced in the retrospective construction of Puranic legends.

Modern India
The Sakaldwipiya Brahmins of Bihar, Odisha, Bengal and Uttar Pradesh are Ayurvedic physicians, priests and landholders.

Puras
Unlike other Brahmin, Sakaldwipia Brahmin practice both gotra and puras exogamy. They have 72 puras named after village settlements such as Urwar i.e from Thekri of Gaya,  Khantwar from Khant of Gaya, Cheriar from cheri of Gaya, Kuraichiar from Kuraich, Makhpawar from Makhpa, Devkuliar from Devkuli, Bhaluniar from Bhaluni, Dumariar, Padariayar, Adaiar, Pawaiar etc.

Notes

References

Brahmin communities of Bihar
Brahmin communities of Odisha
Brahmin communities of Uttar Pradesh
Brahmin communities of West Bengal